Ovidio Cortázar Ramos (born 1 September 1962) is a Mexican politician from the National Action Party. From 2009 to 2012 he served as Deputy of the LXI Legislature of the Mexican Congress representing Chiapas, and previously served in the Congress of Chiapas.

References

1962 births
Living people
People from Tuxtla Gutiérrez
National Action Party (Mexico) politicians
21st-century Mexican politicians
Politicians from Chiapas
Members of the Congress of Chiapas
Deputies of the LXI Legislature of Mexico
Members of the Chamber of Deputies (Mexico) for Chiapas